The 2014 FIBA Americas League was played between January and March, 2014. It was the 7th edition of the first-tier and most important professional international club basketball competition in the regions of South America, Central America, the Caribbean, and Mexico, with the winner of the competition being crowned as the best team and champion of all of those regions.

Groups

Group A

Group B

Group C

Group D

Semifinals

Group E

Group F

Final 4

External links
FIBA Americas League 
FIBA Americas League 
FIBA Americas  
FIBA Liga Americas Twitter 
LatinBasket.com FIBA Americas League 
Liga de las Américas YouTube Channel 

2013–14
2013–14 in South American basketball
2013–14 in North American basketball